Beach volleyball at the 2010 Asian Beach Games was held from 9 December to 16 December 2010 in Al-Musannah Sports City, Muscat, Oman.

Medalists

Medal table

Results

Men

Preliminary

Pool A

Pool B

Pool C

Pool D

Pool E

Pool F

Pool G

Pool H

Knockout round

Women

Preliminary

Pool A

Pool B

Pool C

Pool D

Knockout round

References
 Men's Results
 Women's Results

External links
 Official site
 AVC page for 2010 Asian Beach Games

2010 Asian Beach Games events
Asian Beach Games
2010